Scouts Canada operates about 200 Scout camps across Canada. The Tamaracouta Scout Reserve is among the oldest continually operating Scout camps in the world.

List of local councils
Camps of Scouts Canada, currently includes:

 Impeesa Extreme
 Haliburton Scout Reserve
 Camp Byng
 Camp Barnard
 Camp Opemikon
 Tamaracouta Scout Reserve.

See also
List of council camps (Boy Scouts of America)
Historically notable Scout camps

References

C
Scouting-related lists